The men's freestyle light heavyweight was a freestyle wrestling event held as part of the Wrestling at the 1924 Summer Olympics programme. It was the second appearance of the event. Light heavyweight was the second-heaviest category, including wrestlers weighing from 79 to 87 kilograms.

Results
Source: Official results; Wudarski

Gold medal round

Silver medal round

Bronze medal round
As Wilson, Westergren, Hutmacker, and Mylläri declined to compete, Charles Courant was awarded the bronze medal.

References

Wrestling at the 1924 Summer Olympics